Polygala monspeliaca is a species of annual herb in the family Polygalaceae. They have a self-supporting growth form and simple leaves. Individuals can grow to 5 cm.

Sources

References 

monspeliaca
Flora of Malta